Dabrava is a village in Balchik Municipality, Dobrich Province, northeastern Bulgaria.

Dabrava Glacier on Graham Land, Antarctica is named after the village.

References

Villages in Dobrich Province